Maksym Anatoliyovych Boyko (born 27 May 2004) is a Ukrainian professional footballer who plays as a central midfielder for Ukrainian club Alians Lypova Dolyna.

References

External links
 Profile on Alians Lypova Dolyna official website
 
 

2004 births
Living people
People from Nedryhailiv
Ukrainian footballers
Association football midfielders
FC Alians Lypova Dolyna players
Ukrainian First League players
Sportspeople from Sumy Oblast